Innu Takuaikan Uashat Mak Mani-Utenam is an Innu First Nations band government in Quebec, Canada. It is based in Sept-Îles in the Côte-Nord region on the North shore of the Saint Lawrence River. It owns two reserves: Maliotenam 27A and Uashat 27 located at both ends of Sept-Îles. It is governed by a band council and is a member of the Mamuitun Tribal Council.

Population
, the band has a total registered population of 4,781 members.  According to Statistics Canada's 2016 Canadian Census, Uashat had a population of 1,592 up 7.2% from 1,485 found in the 2011 Census. Maliotenam had a population of 1,542 in 2016, up 17.2% from 1,316 in 2011.

Politics
The Nation is governed by a chief and band council of six members. For the 2019–2022 tenure, the chief of the band council of Uasuat-Maliotenam is Mike (Pelash) McKenzie.

The Innu of Uashat-Maliotenam and those of Matimekosh-Lac-John are represented in land claims negotiations by the Corporation Ashuanipi.

Languages

The language of the Innu people is Innu-aimun. According to the 2016 Canadian Census, on a total population of 3,125, 85.9% know an indigenous language. More precisely, 79.0% have an indigenous language still spoken and understood as a first language and 82.4% speak an indigenous language at home. For official languages, 9.9% know both, 87.8% know only French, 0.5% know only English and 1.8% don't know any.

Notable people
Notable people from the community include:
 Michèle Audette, former president of the Native Women's Association of Canada
 Florent Vollant and Claude McKenzie of musical group Kashtin
 Naomi Fontaine, novelist 
 Jonathan Genest-Jourdain, former federal Member of Parliament for Manicouagan

References

External links
 First Nation Details by Indigenous and Northern Affairs Canada
 
 

First Nations governments in Quebec
Innu